Caetano Horta Pombo (born 15 January 2003) is a Spanish rower. He competed in the 2020 Summer Olympics.

References

2003 births
Living people
Rowers at the 2020 Summer Olympics
Spanish male rowers
Olympic rowers of Spain
People from Noia (comarca)
Sportspeople from the Province of A Coruña